The Irish Hospitals Tournament was a  professional golf tournament played from 1958 to 1962. Total prize money was £5000 from 1958 to 1960 and £5,555 in 1961 and 1962. It was sponsored by the Irish Hospitals' Sweepstake. In 1963 it was succeeded by the Carroll Sweet Afton Tournament which later became the Carroll's International.

Kel Nagle's 1961 performance of 260 was reportedly the lowest score ever recorded at a 72 hole tournament outside of the United States. As of 1973, it had yet to be broken.

Winners 

In 1960 O'Connor scored 63 in the play-off to Bousfield's 71.

References

Golf tournaments in the Republic of Ireland
Golf in County Dublin
1958 establishments in Ireland
1962 disestablishments in Ireland